Iván de la Maza Maillet (born 18 October 1940) is a Chilean teacher and politician who was Intendant of the Valparaíso Region.

Biography

Early life
The son of Guillermo De la Maza and Teresa Maillet, he was born on 18 October 1940 in Talcahuano. Then, his family moved to Valparaíso Region, so Iván de la Maza attended the Rubén Castro School. 

De la Maza carried out his higher education at the Pontifical Catholic University of Valparaíso (PUCV) History Institute, where he obtained his BA as teacher in 1967. Similarly, there he was president of the Students Center.

Once graduated, he worked at the Ventanas Power Plant as industrial relationer. By the other, from 1968 he served as Communications Director of the PUCV.

Political career
He began his political militancy during his time at the university, when he joined the Christian Democratic Party.

In 1967, he was elected alderman for Valparaíso and later he was president of the Provincial Confederation of Municipalities.

During Juan Andueza Silva's tenure as mayor, he held the position of regional coordinator of the General Directorate of Sports (DIGEDER) in the Valparaíso Region.

In the 1993 Chilean general election, he was a elected as deputy for the 12th District of Olmué, Limache, Villa Alemana and Quilpué. Thus, in the 1994−1998 period, De la Maza's work in the Congress was related to the commissions like Regionalization, Planning or Social Development. Similarly, he was a replacement deputy in the commissions of Natural Resources, National Assets or Environment.

During president Ricardo Lagos' government (2000−2006), he was appointed as Provincial Governor of Valparaíso, holding the position from July 2003 to 11 March 2006, when Lagos left the presidency and assumed Michelle Bachelet.

During Bachelet's first government (2006−2010), De la Maza was appointed as Intendant of the Valparaíso Region, holding that position during the whole Bachelet's period.

In June 2008, he was decorated by the Investigations Police of Chile with the «Honor of Merit» medal for his commitment and efforts made to reduce crime rates during his work as intendant.

References

External links
 BCN Profile

1940 births
Living people
Pontifical Catholic University of Valparaíso alumni
Christian Democratic Party (Chile) politicians
20th-century Chilean politicians
21st-century Chilean politicians
People from Talcahuano
Members of the Chamber of Deputies of Chile
Intendants of Valparaíso Region